Ernest (24 March 144126 August 1486) was Elector of Saxony from 1464 to 1486.

Ernst was the founder and progenitor of the Ernestine line of Saxon princes.

Biography

Ernst was born in Meissen, the second son (but fourth in order of birth) of the eight children of Frederick II, Elector of Saxony and Margaret of Austria, sister of Frederick III, Holy Roman Emperor.
The death of his older brother Frederick (1451) made him the new heir apparent to the position of Elector of Saxony.

The Stealing of the Princes).

In 1464, he succeeded his father as Elector of Saxony, and annexed Thuringia in 1482, and three years later (Treaty of Leipzig, 1485) shared his territory with his brother Albert, until he arranged the division of the common possession.

According to the Treaty of Leipzig he received an area around Wittenberg, the southern Thuringian part, the Vogtland and parts of the Pleissnerland. As a residence he selected Wittenberg. He provided for the welfare of the country and introduced the constitution.

One year after the division, Ernest died in Colditz, at the age of 46 years, the consequence of a fall from a horse.

Children

In Leipzig on 19 November 1460 Ernst married Elisabeth of Bavaria. They had seven children:
Christina (25 December 1461, Torgau8 December 1521, Odense), married on 6 September 1478 to King John I of Denmark
Frederick III, Elector of Saxony (17 January 1463, Torgau5 May 1525, Lockau)
Ernest (26 June 1464, Meissen3 August 1513, Halle), Archbishop of Magdeburg (1476–1480), Bishop of Halberstadt (1480–1513)
Adalbert (8 May 1467, Meissen1 May 1484, Aschaffenburg), Administrator of Mainz
Johann, Elector of Saxony (30 June 1468, Meissen16 August 1532, Schweinitz)
Margarete (4 August 1469, Meissen7 December 1528, Weimar), married on 27 February 1487 to Henry I of Lüneburg
Wolfgang (c. 1473, Meissenc. 1478, Torgau).

Ancestry

References

Sources
 

1441 births
1486 deaths
People from Meissen
Prince-electors of Saxony
House of Wettin
Saxon princes